Fine (also stylized as F.I.N.E.) were a Los Angeles-based rock band of the late 1990s led by Ashley Hamilton.

Discography
 Against the View - February 23, 1999
 single - Wrecking Ball 1999

References

Musical groups from Los Angeles